Erftstadt is a town located about 20 km south-west of Cologne in the Rhein-Erft-Kreis, state of North Rhine-Westphalia, Germany. The name of the town derives from the river that flows through it, the Erft. The neighbouring towns are Brühl, Kerpen, Zülpich and Weilerswist.

A landslide during the 2021 European floods led to the collapse of several houses.

Education 
In Erftstadt are four further schools: two gymnasiums and two Realschulen. The largest gymnasium is the Ville-Gymnasium-Erftstadt, also known as VGE.

Twin towns – sister cities

Erftstadt is twinned with:
 Wokingham, England, United Kingdom (1977)
 Viry-Châtillon, France (1980)
 Jelenia Góra, Poland (1995)
The party Alliance 90/ The Greens applies for becoming a sister city of the Ukrainian city Ternopil, just as Jelenia Góra is, in the city council.

Wards of Erftstadt

The town of Erftstadt consists of the following 17 Stadtbezirke:

Ahrem
Blessem
Bliesheim
Borr
Dirmerzheim
Erp
Frauenthal
Friesheim
Gymnich
Herrig
Kierdorf
Konradsheim
Köttingen
Lechenich
Liblar
Niederberg
Scheuren

Most of the town administration is in Liblar, the most populous Stadtbezirk. The second-most populous Stadtbezirk is Lechenich.

Notable people 

 Carl Schurz (1829–1906), politician and first German-born cabinet secretary (Secretary of the Interior 1877–1881) in the US
 Jean Bungartz (1854–1934), animal artist, specialist author, photographer, breeder, lived from 1886 to 1913 in Lechenich
 Josef Kentenich (1885–1968), founder of the Schoenstatt Apostolic Movement
 Bernd Alois Zimmermann (1918–1970), composer, born in Bliesheim
 Hennes Weisweiler (1919–1983), football coach, born in Lechenich
 Manfred Donike (1933–1995), cyclist, chemist and well-known doping investigator
 Manfred Donike (1960–2003), cyclist and functionary
 Ismail Jakobs, soccer player

References

External links
 Liblar and Carl Schurz

 
Rhein-Erft-Kreis
Districts of the Rhine Province